Leslie Stephen Coles (January 19, 1941 – December 3, 2014) was an American biogerontologist who was the co-founder and executive director of the Gerontology Research Group where he conducted research on supercentenarians and aging. He was also a visiting scholar in the computer science department at the University of California, Los Angeles and an assistant researcher in the Department of Surgery, at the David Geffen School of Medicine.

Biography
Coles was born on January 19, 1941, in New York City. He received his B.S. in electrical engineering from Rensselaer Polytechnic Institute in Troy, New York, his Master's in mathematics from the Carnegie Institute of Technology, and his Ph.D. in systems and communication sciences from Carnegie Mellon University. After obtaining his M.D. at Stanford University School of Medicine, Coles completed his clinical internship in obstetrics and gynaecology at the Jackson Memorial Hospital of the Leonard M. Miller School of Medicine (University of Miami).

Coles was treasurer of the Supercentenarian Research Foundation, as well as co-founder and system administrator of the Gerontology Research Group.

Coles died on December 3, 2014, in Scottsdale, Arizona, of pancreatic cancer. His brain was cryonically preserved by Alcor Life Extension Foundation as their 131st patient.

Selected publications

Journal articles

Books
 L. Stephen Coles (2011) Extraordinary Healing: How the discoveries of Mirko Beljanski, the world's first green molecular biologist, can protect and restore your health. Freedom Press, Topanga, California; .
 L. Stephen Coles and David Steinman (1999) The IP-6 with Inositol Question and Answer Book: Nature's Ultimate Anti-Cancer Pill. Freedom Press, Topanga, California;

References

1941 births
2014 deaths
Biogerontologists
Cryonically preserved people
Life extensionists
Carnegie Mellon University alumni
Rensselaer Polytechnic Institute alumni
Stanford University School of Medicine alumni
Deaths from pancreatic cancer
Deaths from cancer in Arizona
American biologists